Archibald Campbell, 4th Baron Blythswood KCVO (25 April 1870–14 November 1929) was the son of Barrington Campbell, 3rd Baron Blythswood, and grandson of Archibald Douglas of Mains.

In 1916 his name was legally changed to Archibald Douglas-Campbell, a surname previously used by his father. Shortly after succeeding to the title of 4th Baron Blythswood, co. Renfrew'  on 13 March 1918, his name was legally changed back to Archibald Campbell.

The family name of the House of Blythswood is derived from Colin Campbell of Elie, a cadet of the House of Ardkinglass in Argyll, who acquired the estate during the reign of Charles I., but through his granddaughter and heiress the property passed to the Douglases of Mains in Dunbartonshire.

He gained the rank of Major in the Scots Guards (Special Reserve) and also in the service of the 4th Battalion, Argyll and Sutherland Highlanders. On 20 May 1922 he was appointed Honorary Colonel of 81st (Welsh) Brigade, Royal Field Artillery.

Campbell was educated at Eton and on 25 July 1895, he married Evelyn Fletcher and they had one child:

Olive Douglas Campbell (1896–1949)

References

 The Douglas Archives website, douglashistory.co.uk; accessed 1 April 2016.

4
Blythswood, Archibald Douglas, 4th Baron
1870 births
1929 deaths
People educated at Eton College
Scots Guards officers
Deputy Lieutenants of Glasgow
Deputy Lieutenants of Lanarkshire
Deputy Lieutenants of Renfrewshire